Natalie Duddington (née Ertel; 14 November 188630 May 1972) was a philosopher and a translator of Russian literature into English. Her first name sometimes appears as Nathalie (with an h).

Biography 
Nataliya Aleksandrovna Ertel was born in Voronezh on 14 November 1886, to the author Alexander Ertel. She was Ertel's oldest daughter and considered intelligent as a child. When the English translator Constance Garnett visited Ertel in the summer of 1904, she was much impressed by Natalie, who began studying at Saint Petersburg University the following year. When the university was temporarily closed due to student unrest in the 1905 revolution, Garnett encouraged Natalie to come to England. She came to England in 1906 and attended University College London (UCL) on a scholarship, graduating with a first-class degree in philosophy  in 1909. At UCL she was a student of the philosopher Dawes Hicks who wrote that she had helped to advance Russian philosophy through her translation of two substantial works of Russian philosophy (by Alexander Lossky and Semyon Frank).

Through her interest in Theosophy, Natalie met John "Jack" Nightingale Duddington, who had been appointed Rector of Ayot St Lawrence in 1905. He divorced his wife in 1911 and began living with Ertel. She married John; they had two children.

Translating 
While in England, Duddington began to assist Constance Garnett, whose eyesight was very poor, in making translations from Russian. Duddington would read her the Russian text, sentence by sentence, and write down the English translation to Constance’s dictation. She elucidated difficult passages and provided background information; thus the final version was the result of close collaboration between the two of them. Natalie was one of very few people of whom Constance could say that their minds met, and they became life-long friends.

Duddington greatly admired Dostoyevsky's novels and successfully campaigned for their translation. Heinemann gave Garnett a contract at the end of 1910, and by 1920 they had completed all twelve volumes, about two-and-a-half million words in all. In the end, Garnett translated around seventy Russian literary works, and Duddington was closely involved with about half of them. When Garnett's productivity eased off after 1920, Duddington undertook more than two dozen works by herself. Among the writers that she translated, Nikolai Berdyaev, Semyon Frank, and Nikolay Lossky were intellectuals expelled by the Bolsheviks from Russia in 1922 on what is known as the Philosophers' ships. Natalie Duddington."

Her partner, Jack, initially helped check that her English was idiomatic; in fact some of her first translations were actually attributed to him. (For instance, in 1908 the Stage Society put on The Bread of Others by  Turgenev, "translated by J. Nightingale Duddington" – who at this point knew no Russian.) Richard Freeborn, Emeritus Professor of English Literature at the University of London, wrote of Duddington's translation of Oblomov, for instance, that "in its particular sensitivity to the subtlety of Goncharov's Russian, in its liveliness and its elegance, it has about it a freshness of manner that admirably matches the same enduring quality in the original."

Duddington was the first to translate several works by Russian authors into English, including Ivan Goncharov's Oblomov, Mikhail Saltykov-Shchedrin's The Golovlyov Family, and a volume of Anna Akhmatova's Forty-Seven Love Poems. Her obituary in The Times wrote that she deserved "much of the credit for spreading an appreciation of Russian literature in England."

Philosophy 
Duddington had an interest in philosophy. In 1916 she, along with philosophers Beatrice Edgell, and Susan Stebbing were some of the first women to be elected to serve on the Executive Committee of the Aristotelian Society. In 1918 she read a paper on "Our Knowledge of Other Minds" to the Aristotelian Society. It was critically reviewed in an issue of Mind, to which she wrote a considered response: "Do we know other minds mediately or im-mediately?" Duddington considered some of her translations of Russian philosophers her "most worthwhile" work.

English translations 

 Vladimir Sergeyevich Solovyov, The Justification of the Good: an essay on moral philosophy. 1918

 Nikolay Onufriyevich Lossky, The Intuitive Basis of Knowledge: an epistemological inquiry. 1919
 Vladimir Grigoryevich Chertkov, The Last Days of Tolstoy. 1922
 Dmitry Sergeyevich Merezhkovsky, December the Fourteenth. 1923
 Dmitry Sergeyevich Merezhkovsky, The Birth of the Gods. 1926
 Semyon Lyudvigovich Frank, God with Us: Three Meditations. 1926
 Dmitry Sergeyevich Merezhkovsky, Akhnaton, King of Egypt. 1927
 Anna Akhmatova, Forty-Seven Love Poems. 1927
 Aleksandr Sergeyevich Pushkin, The Captain’s Daughter and other stories. 1928
 Nikolay Onufriyevich Lossky, The World as an Organic Whole. 1928
 Ivan Goncharov, Oblomov. 1929
 Dmitry Sergeyevich Merezhkovsky, Michael Angelo and Other Sketches. 1930
 Ivan Sozontovich Lukash, The Flames of Moscow. 1930
 Viktor Pavlovich Kin, Over The Border. 1932
 Nikolay Onufriyevich Lossky, Freedom of Will. 1932
 Tatiana Tchernavin, Escape from the Soviets. 1933 ("translated by N. Alexander")
 Tatiana Tchernavin, We, Soviet Women. 1935 ("translated by N. Alexander")
 Nikolai Alexandrovich Berdyaev, The Destiny of Man. 1937
 Boris Konstantinovich Zaytsev, Anna. 1937
Lev Aleksandrovich Zander, Vision and Action. 1948
 Lev Aleksandrovich Zander, Dostoevsky. 1948
 Ivan Sergeyevich Turgenev, Smoke. 1949
 Vladimir Sergeyevich Solovyov, A Solovyov Anthology 1950
 Mikhail Saltykov-Shchedrin, The Golovlyov Family. 1955
 Alexander Ertel, The Specialist and A Greedy Peasant in Eight Great Russian Short Stories. 1962.
Reality and Man. 1966.
 Russian Folk Tales from the collection made by Alexander Nikolayevich Afanasyev, 1967
 Vasily Osipovich Klyuchevsky, A Course in Russian History. 1968 (repr. 1994)

Books edited and/or compiled 

 A First Russian Reader. 1943
 Intermediate Russian Reader. 1949
 Russian short stories: XIXth century (an "Oxford Russian Reader") 1953
 Lev Nikolaevich Tolstoy, Lev Tolstoy, Selections. 1959

References 

1882 births
1972 deaths
19th-century British women writers
19th-century British writers
20th-century British women writers
Alumni of University College London
English translators
Russian–English translators
Translators of Leo Tolstoy
Translators of Fyodor Dostoyevsky